Mark Edward Rubinstein (June 8, 1944 – May 9, 2019) was a leading financial economist and financial engineer.  He was Paul Stephens Professor of Applied Investment Analysis at the Haas School of Business of the University of California, Berkeley.
He held various other professional offices, directing the American Finance Association, amongst others,
 and was editor of several first-tier academic journals including both the Journal of Financial Economics and the Journal of Finance.
He was the author of numerous papers  and four books.
His book Option Markets, 

was "the first work that popularized probabilistic and scientific methods in options, helping inaugurate the derivatives revolution."

Rubinstein was a senior and pioneering academic in the field of finance, focusing on derivatives, particularly options, and was known  for his contributions to both theory and practice, especially portfolio insurance and the binomial options pricing model (also known as the Cox-Ross-Rubinstein model), as well as his work on discrete time stochastic calculus more generally. 
Along with fellow Berkeley finance professor Hayne E. Leland and adjunct professor John O'Brien, Rubinstein developed the portfolio insurance financial product in 1976. (This strategy later became associated with the October 19, 1987, Stock Market Crash; see ). With Leland and O'Brien he also introduced the first exchange-traded fund (ETF) in the United States.  Rubinstein popularized the term "exotic option" in 1990/92 working paper "Exotic Options" (with Eric Reiner), with the term based either on "exotic wagers" in Horse racing, or due to the use of international terms such as "Asian option", suggesting the "exotic Orient".

Rubinstein had been on the Haas faculty since 1972. 
He was instrumental in building the Haas-Berkeley Master of Financial Engineering (MFE) Program, focused on equipping candidates with skills in financial engineering for careers as quants; he was also involved in teaching courses on the program; and previously various other finance courses, both on the Haas-MBA and at Berkeley.
The Berkeley-MFE was considered by many as the number one financial engineering program in the US.

He held a BA in economics from Harvard University magna cum laude , an MBA in finance from Stanford University, and a PhD in finance from the University of California, Los Angeles.

See also
Compound option
Edgeworth binomial tree
Implied binomial tree
Lattice model (finance)
Rainbow option

References

External links
 Faculty Profile
 Personal Homepage (Archived)
 SSRN Author Page

Haas School of Business faculty
Harvard University alumni
Stanford Graduate School of Business alumni
University of California, Los Angeles alumni
Financial economists
Jewish American scientists
1944 births
2019 deaths
Presidents of the American Finance Association
21st-century American Jews